Leptoguignardia is a genus of fungi in the family Botryosphaeriaceae. It contains the single species Leptoguignardia onobrychidis.

References

Botryosphaeriales